Rhagapodemus is a genus of extinct rodent from the Miocene to Pleistocene periods. Most species are known from European localities, although R. debruijni comes from India.

Taxonomy
Rhagapodemus was closely related to the field mice of the genus Apodemus. One species, R. minor, is considered ancestral to another extinct genus, Rhagamys, which was endemic to Sardinia and Corsica up until the end of the Pleistocene.

References

Prehistoric rodent genera
Miocene rodents
Pliocene rodents
Pleistocene rodents
Prehistoric mammals of Europe
Prehistoric mammals of Asia
Muridae